Reuben Porter (born 26 March 1997) is a Cook Islands international rugby league footballer who plays as a  forward for the Tweed Seagulls in the Queensland Cup.

Background
Porter was born in Wellington, New Zealand. He is of Cook Islands descent.

Playing career

Club career
Porter came through the youth system at the Sydney Roosters.

He played for the Wyong Roos in 2018.

Porter played for the Mount Pritchard Mounties between 2019 and 2020.

He joined the Tweed Seagulls ahead of the 2022 Queensland Cup season.

International career
Porter made his international debut for the Cook Islands in May 2017 against Papua New Guinea.

In 2022 he was named in the Cook Islands squad for the 2021 Rugby League World Cup.

References

External links
Tweed Seagulls profile
Cook Islands profile

1997 births
Living people
Cook Islands national rugby league team players
New Zealand rugby league players
New Zealand sportspeople of Cook Island descent
Rugby league second-rows